CarParts.com (formerly U.S. Auto Parts Network, Inc.) is an American online provider of aftermarket auto parts, including collision parts, engine parts, and performance parts and accessories. The company is headquartered in Torrance, California and was founded in 1995 by Sol Khazani and Mehran Nia. It is traded on NASDAQ as PRTS. The company sells 1.2 million SKUs, including 58,000 private label SKUs.

History

Early Years

U.S. Auto Parts Network, Inc. was founded in 1995 by Sol Khazani and Mehran Nia. The company was first incorporated in California in 1995 and reincorporated in Delaware in March 2006. The flagship website, CarParts.com, was established in 1999 as an e-commerce site. Its online catalogue carries parts for different make models.

In addition to the corporate headquarters in Torrance, California, the company has distribution centers in LaSalle, Illinois, Chesapeake, Virginia (opened 2016), Grand Prairie, Texas, and Las Vegas, Nevada. The warehouse at 2821 Marion Drive in Las Vegas, Nevada was opened to cut shipping times for its customers in the West. The company planned to invest between $13 million and $15 million in the facility.

2019

CarParts.com had 335 employees in the United States. The company also had 500 employees in the Philippines handling a call center, website development, and back office.  Online sales on eBay and Amazon each represented 42% of their sales, and private label collision parts were responsible for 62% of revenue. Their annual sales were $280 million at a gross margin of 30%.

In 2019, the company launched a scholarship program for students enrolled in college or any post-secondary institution located within the U.S.

Lev Peker replaced Aaron Coleman, the company CEO, in January 2019. Barry Phelps is chairman of the board.

2020

For the first quarter of 2020, CarParts.com reported record net sales, the highest quarterly sales in the history of the company. Gross profit of $29.8 million in the first quarter of 2020 was the highest quarterly gross profit in nearly a decade.

In February 2020, CarParts.com implemented an extensive rebranding initiative as part of its plans for growth. The company revamped its website design and logo, and introduced the new tagline, “Right Parts, Guaranteed.”

During the COVID-19 pandemic, CarParts.com received $4.1 million in federally backed small business loans from J.P. Morgan as part of the Paycheck Protection Program. The company was not among the intended beneficiaries of this loan program aimed at small businesses. CarParts.com reported their highest revenue in eight years just before the pandemic started and has access to a $30 million line of credit with JP Morgan, which had a zero balance on December 28, 2019. After new SBA guidance for public companies, CarParts.com returned the loan.

In May 2020, Auto Parts Warehouse was merged into the flagship website, CarParts.com. CarParts.com also announced a partnership with Front Row Motor Sports as a primary partner for Michael McDowell in the NASCAR Cup Series' return to racing at Darlington Raceway on May 17, 2020 and May 20, 2020

In June 2020, CarParts.com (NASDAQ: PRTS) was added to the Russell 2000 Index. In July 2020, CEO and fo-founder of Enplug Nanxi Liu became the first woman on the company's board.

In July 2020, JC Whitney, a subsidiary of CarParts.com, was merged into the flagship website. JC Whitney will launch a new line of accessories for Jeep and truck owners on its new website. In the same month, the company also changed its name from U.S. Auto Parts Network, Inc. to CarParts.com, the name of its flagship website. The U.S. Auto Parts NASDAQ ticker (PRTS) was retained.

In August 2020, CarParts.com reported record sales and gross profit for second quarter 2020. Net sales for the quarter increased 61% to a company record $118.9 million vs. $73.7 million. Gross profit increased 88% to a company record $40.8 million vs. $21.8 million.

2021

In January 2021, website analytics firm SimilarWeb named CarParts.com the Fastest-Growing Auto Parts Site of 2020, citing 194 percent year-on-year growth. SimilarWeb also cited that the site surpassed its competitors in terms overall site visitors.

In April 2021, CarParts.com announced that it has appointed Henry Maier to its board of directors.

2022 
CarParts.com announced effective April 18, 2022, COO & CFO, David Meniane transitioned to CEO and SVP of Finance, Ryan Lockwood was appointed CFO. Lev Peker has stepped down as Chief Executive Officer and director, effective as of close of business on April 15, 2022, to pursue other business opportunities.

Acquisitions and Sales 
In 2010, CarParts.com purchased Automotive Specialty Accessories and Parts ("ASAP") including ASAP's subsidiary, WAG (Whitney Automotive Group, owners of JC Whitney).

In 2018, CarParts.com sold AutoMD for $1.4 million.

In March 2021, CarParts.com announced that the company entered into a definitive asset purchase agreement with Premium Guard, a global automotive aftermarket supplier, to acquire all Precise Fuel Delivery Systems ("Precise") inventory and data. Premium Guard's Precise assets were absorbed and added to CarParts.com's premium fuel brand, "DriveMotive."

Services

CarParts.com sells auto parts and accessories for car repair, maintenance, and collision to a wide range of customers in the continental United States. In addition, it also has a  catalog with over 1 million products.

The company operates warehouses in LaSalle, Illinois, Chesapeake, Virginia, Las Vegas, Nevada, and Grand Prairie, Texas. It also has plans to open another distribution center in Jacksonville, Florida that is slated to open in the first quarter of 2022.

CarParts.com ships its products via air or truck freight.

The website's blog, In The Garage, publishes industry news articles, features, auto repair guides, and tips for maintaining vehicles.

See also

 Advance Auto Parts
 AutoZone
 Carquest
 Auto Parts Warehouse
 JC Whitney
 National Automotive Parts Association (NAPA)
 O'Reilly Auto Parts
 Pep Boys
 Summit Racing Equipment
 Copart

References

External links
 CarParts.com web site

Automotive part retailers of the United States
Online automotive companies of the United States
American companies established in 1995
Retail companies established in 1995
Internet properties established in 1995
Retail companies based in California
Companies based in Torrance, California
Torrance, California